Fickling Mill is an unincorporated community in Taylor County, in the U.S. state of Georgia.

History
The community was named for one Dr. Fickling, an early settler and Civil War veteran. Variant names were "Fickling", "Ficklings Mill", "Ficklins Mill", and "Flickins Mill". A post office called Fickling was established in 1887, and remained in operation until 1903.

References

Unincorporated communities in Taylor County, Georgia
Unincorporated communities in Georgia (U.S. state)